The Golden Casket is the seventh studio album by the American alternative rock band Modest Mouse, released on June 25, 2021 on Epic Records. Produced by Dave Sardy & Jacknife Lee, the album was preceded by the singles, "We Are Between", "Leave a Light On" & "The Sun Hasn't Left".

The album is the last to feature guitarist Jim Fairchild & Lisa Molinaro. Both departed from the band just days prior to the album's release. This was also the last album to feature drummer Jeremiah Green before his death in December 2022.

Critical reception

The Golden Casket received generally positive reviews from critics. At Metacritic, which assigns a normalized rating out of 100 to reviews from critics, the album received an average score of 78, which indicates "generally favorable reviews," based on 12 reviews. Reviewing for Rolling Stone, Kory Grow characterized the album as "textured and messy as humanly possible," writing: "Like many Modest Mouse records, The Golden Casket sounds cluttered." Conversely, Pitchforks Evan Rytlewskia called the album a "procession of pinging, clanging, reverberating tactile pleasures". NMEs Jordan Bassett gave the album five stars, labeling it a "masterful psychedelic patchwork." He concluded with a quote from a fan: "Brought me comfort at 13… Bringing me comfort at 31. My goodness does life go by quick."

Track listing

Personnel
Modest Mouse

Isaac Brock – vocals, electric guitar (all tracks); synthesizer (1, 5, 7–10), percussion (4, 5), banjo, melodica (5); bass guitar (6–8, 10), drums, loops (6); drum machine, marimba (7); creative direction
Jeremiah Green – drums (1, 3–12)
Tom Peloso – bass guitar, horn (3); synthesizer (4), guitar (6), piano (6, 9, 11)
Jim Fairchild – guitar (3)
Russell Higbee – bass guitar (1, 4–9, 11, 12), synthesizer (1, 4, 7, 10, 11), electric guitar (2, 3, 7, 10), strings (10), drums (11)
Lisa Molinaro – vocals (4, 5, 7), viola (5, 12), background vocals (11)
Ben Massarella – shaker (1, 4, 5, 7–11), tambourine, tom toms (1, 8); claves, cowbell, handbells, xylophone (1); drums (3, 10), percussion (4, 10), vibraslap (5), cymbals (8); bongos, snare drum (10); electronic drums (11)

Additional contributors

 Stephen Marcussen – mastering
 Stewart Whitmore – mastering
 D. Sardy – mixing (1, 3, 5, 6, 8, 9, 11), acoustic guitar (1, 5, 6, 9, 11), electric guitar (2, 6, 8), organ (2, 5), synthesizer (2, 5, 8–11), chimes (2), keyboards (4), piano (5, 6, 8); shaker, tambourine (6, 9); drums (6), bass guitar (7, 8, 10), vocals (7, 10, 11), guitar (7), timpani (11)
 Jacknife Lee – mixing, engineering, bass guitar, drums, guitar, keyboards, vocals (2, 4, 7, 10); percussion, synthesizer (4, 7, 10); background vocals, piano (4)
 John McEntire – mixing, engineering (12) 
 Cameron Barton – engineering (1–11)
 Jim Monti – engineering (1–11)
 Jeremy Sherrer – engineering (12)
 Matt Bishop – editor (2–4, 7, 10)
 Jordan Katz – horn (7) 
 Dylan Odbert – art direction, design

Charts

References

2021 albums
Modest Mouse albums
Epic Records albums
Albums produced by Dave Sardy
Albums produced by Jacknife Lee